Arkley W. Frieze (June 24, 1914 – August 25, 1969) was an American politician from Carthage, Missouri, who served in the Missouri Senate.  In 1948, he was elected city attorney for Carthage, Missouri.  He was previously elected to be prosecuting attorney of Dade County, Missouri.

References

1914 births
1969 deaths
Republican Party Missouri state senators
20th-century American politicians
People from Carthage, Missouri
People from Greenfield, Missouri